Hope 7 is the self-titled debut album from the pop rock band Hope 7. The album was released on March 15, 2005, and is the band's only album release to date. The tracks on this album were mainly written by Antonina Armato and Tim James (with the exception of tracks 3, which was written by Aaron Dudley and track 7 (which was written by Kristi McClave (the band's lead vocalist) and Dave Noble (Hope 7's guitarist). McClave also collaborated on the writing of track 8.

The album spawned one single, Breakthrough, which appeared on the Disney Channel.

Track listing

"Top Of The World" (Antonina Armato/Tim James/Rob Giles) 2:30
"Breakthrough" (Antonina Armato/Tim James) 2:44
"Stupid People" (Aaron Dudley) 3:09
"Fly" (Antonina Armato/Tim James) 3:07
"One Thing" (Antonina Armato/Tim James/Greenhouse) 3:03
"He's Enough Reason" (Antonina Armato/Tim James) 3:29
"Better Off" (Kristi McClave/Dave Noble) 2:45
"Falling Down Your Stare" (Antonina Armato/Tim James/Kristi McClave/Samantha Moore) 4:03
"I Want Everything" (Antonina Armato/Tim James) 2:56
"Feels So Good" (Antonina Armato/Tim James/Rob Giles) 4:28
"Who We Are"  (Antonina Armato/Tim James/Greenhouse/Ray Cham) 2:58

Full list of personnel

 Vocals - Kristi McClave
 Guitars - Dave Noble
 Bass - Chevy Martinez
 Drums - Chase Duddy
 Producers - Antonina Armato/Tim James
 Mixed by - Tim James
 Recorded at - Rock Mafia Studios, Santa Monica
 Mastered by - Stephen Marsh @ Threshold Mastering
 Additional musicians - Tim Pierce, Dorion Crozier, Guy, Emerson, Nigel Lundemo
 Falling Down Your Stare strings arranged by - Stevie Blacke
 Top Of The World drum programming - Nigel Lundemo
 Photography - Deborah Wald
 Album Coordinator - Angela P. Bures
 Art Direction - Deborah Razo, Razdezignz
 Managed by - PC Alliance

Reception
Allmusic [ link]

External links
Hope 7 (album) at Amazon.com

2005 debut albums
Albums produced by Rock Mafia